San Julián (Santa Cruz) is a small town in Bolivia that is the seat of San Julián municipality.

References

Populated places in Santa Cruz Department (Bolivia)